J. D. Short (December 26, 1902 – October 21, 1962) was an American Delta blues singer, guitarist, and harmonicist with a distinctive vibrato-laden singing voice. Early in his career, he recorded under a number of pseudonyms, including Jelly Jaw Short. His noteworthy works include "Lonesome Swamp Rattlesnake" and "You're Tempting Me".

Biography
Short was born in Port Gibson, Mississippi. He was a cousin of Big Joe Williams and David "Honeyboy" Edwards. He learned to play the piano and the guitar at an early age. He later mastered the harmonica, saxophone, clarinet, and drums. He performed locally in the Mississippi Delta at house parties. In 1923, he relocated to St. Louis, Missouri.

Short went on to play with the Neckbones, Henry Spaulding, Honeyboy Edwards, Douglas Williams, and his cousin, Big Joe Williams. In the 1930s, he recorded for Vocalion Records. The musician Henry Townsend, in his autobiography, A Blues Life, told of an incident in St. Louis in which, seemingly out of jealousy of Townsend's musical standing, Short attacked and stabbed him twice. Later, by way of revenge, Townsend shot Short in the genitals, destroying Short's testicles. The account was also mentioned in Townsend's obituary in The Guardian. Short continued performing in St. Louis after World War II, often as a one-man band and sometimes with his cousin, Big Joe Williams.

Short disappeared from the music industry for more than two decades before re-emerging during the blues revival of the 1960s. He achieved national recognition and went on to record for Delmark Records and Folkways Records. Later, some of his recordings were released by Sonet Records.

Short appeared in a documentary film entitled The Blues that was released in 1963, where he was featured singing "Slidin' Delta".

He died of a heart attack in October 1962, at the age of 59, in St. Louis.

Discography
Compilations
Stavin' Chain Blues, with Big Joe Williams (1961, Delmark Records)
Blues from the Mississippi Delta, with Son House (1963, Folkways Records)
Legacy of the Blues Vol. 8 (Sonet 648), 1973, recorded in St. Louis, July 1962

See also
List of country blues musicians
List of Delta blues musicians
List of Memphis blues musicians

References

External links
Complete discography at Wirz.de

1902 births
1962 deaths
People from Port Gibson, Mississippi
American blues harmonica players
American blues singers
Songwriters from Mississippi
Singers from Mississippi
Memphis blues musicians
Delta blues musicians
Country blues musicians
St. Louis blues musicians
Delmark Records artists
20th-century American singers
Blues musicians from Mississippi
Sonet Records artists